Reema Kagti (real name: Reema Kakati) is an Indian film director and screenwriter, who works in Bollywood. She made her debut as a director in the critically acclaimed Honeymoon Travels Pvt. Ltd. (2007), which was followed by the neo-noir, Talaash (2012) and the historical sports drama Gold (2018). Reema along with Zoya Akhtar founded Tiger Baby Films, a film and web studio, in October 2015.

Early life 
In an interview, Reema Kagti said that, she is native of Borhapjan of Tinsukia district, Assam, and her father runs a farm. She also said that, she moved to Mumbai in her teenage, after schooling in Delhi.

Career
Born as Reema Kakati in an Assamese family, she now uses Kagti as her last name. Reema has worked as an assistant director with many leading directors including Farhan Akhtar (Dil Chahta Hai, Lakshya), Ashutosh Gowariker (Lagaan), Honey Irani (Armaan), and Mira Nair (Vanity Fair).

She has been an associate with Excel Entertainment since its inception, as she has assisted both Farhan Akhtar and Zoya Akhtar in all their films and commercials to date. Together, Reema and Zoya Akhtar helm Tiger Baby Films, a film production company, founded in October 2015.

Directorial career
Reema made her directorial debut with Honeymoon Travels Pvt. Ltd. in 2006. Her next film, Talaash, was a suspense drama starring Aamir Khan, Rani Mukerji and Kareena Kapoor. Her latest directorial venture Gold, is a film about India's first Olympic gold medal after its independence.

Filmography

 As Assistant Director

Awards

References

External links

 
 Reema Kagti: Filmography and Profile

Living people
Indian women film directors
Sophia College for Women alumni
Hindi-language film directors
Indian women screenwriters
Sophia Polytechnic alumni
21st-century Indian film directors
21st-century Indian women writers
21st-century Indian dramatists and playwrights
Writers from Guwahati
Women writers from Assam
Film directors from Assam
Screenwriters from Assam
21st-century Indian screenwriters
1972 births